The Split Channel, is a channel in the Adriatic Sea, off the coast of mainland Dalmatia, defined by the southern shores of the island of Čiovo, the northern shores of the island of Šolta and the western shores of the island of Brač. It is accessible from the open sea through the Drvenik Channel or Šolta Channel from the west, and through the Split Gates (Splitska vrata) straits—narrow passage between Šolta and Brač to the south of the Split Channel. To the east, the Split Channel is connected to the Brač Channel. All the access routes accommodate capesize ships.

The Split Channel and the Split Gates, named after the nearby city of Split, are the most direct route from the international waters to the Port of Split. In the Split Gates lies Mrduja island, an islet notable for being the turning point of the local Mrduja Regatta, an annual sailboat competition.

On the Brač side lies deep Milna bay and the village of Milna. On the Šolta side of the channel, there are no villages in the immediate vicinity.

See also
Split
Split Gates
Dalmatia
Brač
Šolta
Čiovo

References

Dalmatia
Adriatic Sea
Channels of the Mediterranean Sea
Brač
Landforms of Split-Dalmatia County
Channels of Europe